Shaun Smith (born April 5, 1982) is a former American football linebacker who was an international practice squad player for the Carolina Panthers of the National Football League. He was signed by the Southern Sundevils in 2001.

Smith was also a member of the Rhein Fire and Berlin Thunder.

External links
Carolina Panthers bio

1982 births
Living people
American football linebackers
Berlin Thunder players
Carolina Panthers players
British American Football League players
British expatriates in Germany
English expatriates in the United States
English players of American football
Sportspeople from Bournemouth
Rhein Fire players